Caleb C. Harris (September 22, 1836 – September 24, 1904) was an American farmer, physician, and politician.

Born in the township of Springfield, Erie County, Pennsylvania, Harris moved with his parents to Walworth County, Wisconsin in 1849. In 1857, Harris took part in an expedition against the Sioux tribe in Spirit Lake, Iowa. In 1867, Harris moved to the town of Ottawa, Waukesha County, Wisconsin where he owned a dairy farm and practiced medicine. Harris served on the Waukesha County Board of Supervisors and was a Republican. In 1895. Harris served in the Wisconsin State Assembly. Harris died at his home in Ottawa, Wisconsin from peritonitis for which he had surgery.

Notes

1836 births
1904 deaths
People from Erie County, Pennsylvania
People from Waukesha County, Wisconsin
Farmers from Wisconsin
Physicians from Wisconsin
County supervisors in Wisconsin
Republican Party members of the Wisconsin State Assembly
People from Walworth County, Wisconsin
19th-century American politicians